Frank M. Forstburg (June 5, 1894 – October 13, 1970) was an American football, basketball, and baseball coach.  He served as the head football coach at the University of Delaware from 1925 to 1926, compiling a record of 7–9.  Forstburg was also the head basketball coach at Delaware from 1925 to 1927, amassing a record of 6–23, and the school's head baseball coach in 1926, tallying a mark of 2–10.  Forstburg was born in Lancaster, Pennsylvania.  He died on October 13, 1970, in Wilmington, Delaware.

Head coaching record

Football

References

1894 births
1970 deaths
Basketball coaches from Pennsylvania
Delaware Fightin' Blue Hens baseball coaches
Delaware Fightin' Blue Hens football coaches
Delaware Fightin' Blue Hens men's basketball coaches
Franklin & Marshall Diplomats football players
Sportspeople from Lancaster, Pennsylvania